Bartrum Plateau is an ice-covered plateau,  long and  wide, standing west of Mount Bonaparte in the Queen Elizabeth Range. It was named by the Northern Party of the New Zealand Geological Survey Antarctic Expedition (1961–62) for geologist Professor John Arthur Bartrum of Auckland University College.

References 

Plateaus of Antarctica
Landforms of the Ross Dependency
Shackleton Coast